Giovanni Battista Ercole (1750 – 12 June 1811) was an Italian painter and architect, active in Piacenza in a Neoclassical style. He was born in Erba. He died at Piacenza.

He helped decorate in 1789 the villa Rocca at Corneliano. He participated in the ceiling decoration after 1788 of Santa Maria di Campagna in Piazenza.

References

1750s births
1811 deaths
18th-century Italian painters
Italian male painters
18th-century Italian architects
Italian neoclassical painters
People from Piacenza
18th-century Italian male artists